John Sellekaers is a Canadian-born musician and audio mastering engineer. Born in 1973 in Montreal, Quebec he later moved to Brussels, Belgium.  Beginning with his project Xingu Hill in the 1990s, he has released over 60 records under various aliases such as Night Sky Pulse, Feral Cities, Meeple, and Dead Hollywood Stars on labels such as Ant-Zen, Hymen Records, Nova Zembla and Disques Hushush. His style ranges from experimental music to electronica.

Around 1988, under the influence of electronic music pioneers such as Cabaret Voltaire and Tangerine Dream, he began experimenting with synthesizers. Later, in the early nineties, he started a magazine devoted to underground culture entitled "Noyade mécanique" (for Mechanical drowning). Other contributors for this magazine included Belgian artists such as Olivier Moreau and Seal Phüric.

In 1994, the Belgian underground techno, ambient and IDM record label Nova Zembla signed him for three albums. In 1995 his first album "Maps Of The Impossible" came out under the Xingu Hill moniker.

Besides his main incarnation, Xingu Hill, Sellekaers has recorded under several aliases. They include Dead Hollywood Stars, Urawa, The Missing Ensemble, Uncotones, Ambre, Moonsanto and Ammo. Moonsanto is an experimental music and political project by Sellekaers, C-drik Fermont, Gabriel Séverin and Marc Mœdea. Active since 2000, Moonsanto can be called an industrial supergroup as it consist of members of Xingu Hill, Dead Hollywood Stars, Silk Saw and Ammo. Moonsanto's first full-length release is called Fraud Hell Dope. It is in fact a play on words about Monsanto Company's motto, "Food Health Hope". It is a multinational company active in the genetic engineering market.

He has collaborated with artists such as Mick Harris (of Scorn), David Thrussell (of Snog and Black Lung), Olivier Moreau (of Imminent), C-drik Fermont, Silk Saw and Panacea. In 2005, John Sellekaers, Daniel De Los Santos (of Tamarin) and literary fiction writer Brian Evenson released a record of experimental spoken word.

During his career, John Sellekaers has extensively played live in Europe and North America.

Since 1998, he is also running the Metarc mastering studio, currently located in Montreal.

Despite having released music under a number of monikers over the years, he didn't release music under his own name until 2019 with the release of Residual Broadcast, which was followed by releases in 2021 of Observer Effect on Glacial Movements and Foilum on the Oreille Gardee label. His more recent works trend towards ambient and atmospheric soundscapes, infused with elements of field recording.

References

External links 
 John Sellekaers website
 Villa Cyclope (John's photo project)
 Discogs entry
 Moonsanto discography at Discogs.com

1973 births
Canadian electronic musicians
Living people
Musicians from Montreal